The 1991–92 Combined Counties Football League season was the 14th in the history of the Combined Counties Football League, a football competition in England.

The league was won by Farnham Town for the second season in succession, who subsequently left to join the Isthmian League.

League table

The league was increased from 17 clubs to 19 after two new clubs joined:

Ditton, joining from the Surrey Premier League.
Viking Sports, joining from the Hellenic League Division One.

References

External links
 Combined Counties League Official Site

1991-92
1991–92 in English football leagues